The Festival of Mountain and Plain was an annual celebration of pioneer days in the Old West held in early October in Denver from 1895 to 1899, and in 1901 with a final attempt at revival in 1912. Organized by The Mountain and Plain Festival Association, the event featured a parade and rodeo. It continued until at least 1902. It was a regional celebration and drew pioneers from throughout the West, many of whom had participated in the events celebrated.

William Byers, founder of the Rocky Mountain News, Colorado's first newspaper, was one of its promoters and directors. He originated many of its features: the bal champedre (outdoor ball), a great public masquerade ball held on Broadway; and the four great parades: first, a pageant of western history; second, a masked parade; and, on the third day "a military and social parade, ending with a sham battle at City Park, and in the evening the parade of the slaves of the silver serpent."

Notes

External links
Images of the Festival of Mountain and Plain from the Western History Collection, Denver Public Library
Image of Dragon Float, Harper's Weekly
"The Festival of Mountain and Plain" Pages 383-390 Proceedings of the Second Annual Convention of the Denver National Live Stock Association...with an Appendix on the City of Denver and Its Resources, (1899) compiled by John McNamara, Secretary, Association Festival of Mountain and Plain

History of Denver
Gay Nineties